Riaz Hussain was a serving lieutenant general in the Pakistan Army. He served as the 3rd Director-General of ISI from 1959 to 1966. He became the first Governor of Balochistan serving from 1 July 1970 to 25 December 1971.

Bibliography

References

External links 
 Governor Balochistan

Governors of Balochistan, Pakistan
Year of birth missing
Year of death missing
Directors General of Inter-Services Intelligence
Pakistani generals